Choqapur Aliabad (also Romanized as Choqāpūr ʿĀlīābād) is a village in Rumeshkhan Rural District, Central District, Rumeshkhan County, Lorestan Province, Iran. It lies about a kilometer southeast of the village of Rumiani. At the 2006 census, its population was 659, in 129 families.

References 

Populated places in Rumeshkhan County